Fawziyya al-Sindi (born 1957) is a Bahraini poet and activist.  She has published six collections of poetry since 1982 and her work has been translated into several languages.

Biography
Fawziyya was born in Manama, Bahrain in 1957. She has been acknowledged as one of the first Bahraini women to seek an education abroad, having obtained a degree in commerce from the University of Cairo.

Fawziyya published six collections of Arabic poetry from 1998 to 2005. She is a member of the Bahraini Association of Writers and regularly writes as a columnist to regional magazines and publications like Banipal.

Publications
Akhir Al-Mahab (End of the Horizon) 1998
Malath Al-Rooh (Refuge of the Soul) 1991
Rahinat Al-Alam (Hostage to Pain) 2005

References

External links
 Official website

20th-century Bahraini poets
Living people
1957 births
Bahraini women writers
Bahraini women poets
20th-century poets
20th-century women writers
21st-century poets
21st-century women writers
People from Manama
Cairo University alumni
21st-century Bahraini poets